The Seleucid Empire (Basileía tōn Seleukidōn) was a Greek state in West Asia that existed during the Hellenistic period from 312 BC to 63 BC. The Seleucid Empire was founded by the Macedonian general Seleucus I Nicator, following the division of the Macedonian Empire originally founded by Alexander the Great. 

After receiving the Mesopotamian region of Babylonia in 321 BC, Seleucus I began expanding his dominions to include the Near Eastern territories that encompass modern-day Iraq, Iran, Afghanistan, Syria, all of which had been under Macedonian control after the fall of the former Persian Achaemenid Empire. At the Seleucid Empire's height, it had consisted of territory that had covered Anatolia, Persia, the Levant, and what are now modern Iraq, Kuwait, Afghanistan, and parts of Turkmenistan. 

The Seleucid Empire was a major center of Hellenistic culture. Greek customs and language were privileged; the wide variety of local traditions had been generally tolerated, while an urban Greek elite had formed the dominant political class and was reinforced by steady immigration from Greece. The empire's western territories were repeatedly contested with Ptolemaic Egypt—a rival Hellenistic state. To the east, conflict with the Indian ruler Chandragupta of the Maurya Empire in 305 BC led to the cession of vast territory west of the Indus and a political alliance.

In the early second century BC, Antiochus III the Great attempted to project Seleucid power and authority into Hellenistic Greece, but his attempts were thwarted by the Roman Republic and its Greek allies. The Seleucids were forced to pay costly war reparations and had to relinquish territorial claims west of the Taurus Mountains in southern Anatolia, marking the gradual decline of their empire. Mithridates I of Parthia conquered much of the remaining eastern lands of the Seleucid Empire in the mid-second century BC, while the independent Greco-Bactrian Kingdom continued to flourish in the northeast. The Seleucid kings were thereafter reduced to a rump state in Syria, until their conquest by Tigranes the Great of Armenia in 83 BC, and ultimate overthrow by the Roman general Pompey in 63 BC.

Name

Contemporary sources, such as a loyalist decree honoring Antiochus I from Ilium, in Greek language define the Seleucid state both as an empire (arche) and as a kingdom (basileia). Similarly, Seleucid rulers were described as kings in Babylonia.

Starting from the 2nd century BC, ancient writers referred to the Seleucid ruler as the King of Syria, Lord of Asia, and other designations; the evidence for the Seleucid rulers representing themselves as kings of Syria is provided by the inscription of Antigonus son of Menophilus, who described himself as the "admiral of Alexander, king of Syria". He refers to either Alexander Balas or Alexander II Zabinas as a ruler.

History

Partition of Alexander's empire

Alexander, who quickly conquered the Persian Empire under its last Achaemenid dynast, Darius III, died young in 323 BC, leaving an expansive empire of partly Hellenised culture without an adult heir. The empire was put under the authority of a regent, Perdiccas, and the vast territories were divided among Alexander's generals, who thereby became satraps at the Partition of Babylon, all in that same year.

Rise of Seleucus
Alexander's generals, known as diadochi, jostled for supremacy over parts of his empire following his death. Ptolemy I Soter, a former general and then current satrap of Egypt, was the first to challenge the new system, which eventually led to the demise of Perdiccas. Ptolemy's revolt created a new subdivision of the empire with the Partition of Triparadisus in 320 BC. Seleucus, who had been "Commander-in-Chief of the Companion cavalry" (hetairoi) and appointed first or court chiliarch (which made him the senior officer in the Royal Army after the regent and commander-in-chief Perdiccas since 323 BC, though he helped to assassinate him later) received Babylonia and, from that point, continued to expand his dominions ruthlessly. Seleucus established himself in Babylon in 312 BC, the year later used as the foundation date of the Seleucid Empire.

Babylonian War (311–309 BC) 

The rise of Seleucus in Babylon threatened the eastern extent of the territory of Antigonus I Monophthalmus in Asia. Antigonus, along with his son Demetrius I Poliorcetes, unsuccessfully led a campaign to annex Babylon. The victory of Seleucus ensured his claim of Babylon and legitimacy. He ruled not only Babylonia, but the entire enormous eastern part of Alexander's empire, as described by the historian Appian:

Seleucid–Mauryan War (305–303 BC)

Chandragupta Maurya (Sandrokottos) founded the Maurya Empire in 321 BC after the conquest of the Nanda Empire and their capital Pataliputra in Magadha. Chandragupta then redirected his attention to the Indus and by 317 BC he conquered the remaining Greek satraps left by Alexander. Expecting a confrontation, Seleucus gathered his army and marched to the Indus. It is said that Chandragupta could have fielded a conscript army of 600,000 men and 9,000 war elephants.

Mainstream scholarship asserts that Chandragupta received, formalized through a treaty, vast territory west of the Indus, including the Hindu Kush, modern day Afghanistan, and the Balochistan province of Pakistan. Archaeologically, concrete indications of Mauryan rule, such as the inscriptions of the Edicts of Ashoka, are known as far as Kandahar in southern Afghanistan. According to Appian:

It is generally thought that Chandragupta married Seleucus's daughter, or a Macedonian princess, a gift from Seleucus to formalize an alliance.  In a return gesture, Chandragupta sent 500 war elephants, a military asset which would play a decisive role at the Battle of Ipsus in 301 BC. In addition to this treaty, Seleucus dispatched an ambassador, Megasthenes, to Chandragupta, and later Deimakos to his son Bindusara, at the Mauryan court at Pataliputra (modern Patna in Bihar state). Megasthenes wrote detailed descriptions of India and Chandragupta's reign, which have been partly preserved to us through Diodorus Siculus. Later Ptolemy II Philadelphus, the ruler of Ptolemaic Egypt and contemporary of Ashoka the Great, is also recorded by Pliny the Elder as having sent an ambassador named Dionysius to the Mauryan court.

Other territories ceded before Seleucus' death were Gedrosia in the south-east of the Iranian plateau, and, to the north of this, Arachosia on the west bank of the Indus River.

Westward expansion 

Following his and Lysimachus' decisive victory over Antigonus at the Battle of Ipsus in 301 BC, Seleucus took control over eastern Anatolia and northern Syria.

In the latter area, he founded a new capital at Antioch on the Orontes, a city he named after his father. An alternative capital was established at Seleucia on the Tigris, north of Babylon. Seleucus's empire reached its greatest extent following his defeat of his erstwhile ally, Lysimachus, at Corupedion in 281 BC, after which Seleucus expanded his control to encompass western Anatolia. He hoped further to take control of Lysimachus's lands in Europe – primarily Thrace and even Macedonia itself, but was assassinated by Ptolemy Ceraunus on landing in Europe.

His son and successor, Antiochus I Soter, was left with an enormous realm consisting of nearly all of the Asian portions of the Empire, but faced with Antigonus II Gonatas in Macedonia and Ptolemy II Philadelphus in Egypt, he proved unable to pick up where his father had left off in conquering the European portions of Alexander's empire.

Breakup of Central Asian territories
 

Antiochus I (reigned 281–261 BC) and his son and successor Antiochus II Theos (reigned 261–246 BC) were faced with challenges in the west, including repeated wars with Ptolemy II and a Celtic invasion of Asia Minor—distracting attention from holding the eastern portions of the Empire together. Towards the end of Antiochus II's reign, various provinces simultaneously asserted their independence, such as Bactria and Sogdiana under Diodotus, Cappadocia under Ariarathes III, and Parthia under Andragoras. A few years later, the last was defeated and killed by the invading Parni of Arsaces – the region would then become the core of the Parthian Empire.

Diodotus, governor for the Bactrian territory, asserted independence in around 245 BC, although the exact date is far from certain, to form the Greco-Bactrian Kingdom. This kingdom was characterized by a rich Hellenistic culture and was to continue its domination of Bactria until around 125 BC when it was overrun by the invasion of northern nomads. One of the Greco-Bactrian kings, Demetrius I of Bactria, invaded India around 180 BC to form the Indo-Greek Kingdoms.

The rulers of Persis, called Fratarakas, also seem to have established some level of independence from the Seleucids during the 3rd century BC, especially from the time of Vahbarz. They would later overtly take the title of Kings of Persis, before becoming vassals to the newly formed Parthian Empire.

The Seleucid satrap of Parthia, named Andragoras, first claimed independence, in a parallel to the secession of his Bactrian neighbour. Soon after, however, a Parthian tribal chief called Arsaces invaded the Parthian territory around 238 BC to form the Arsacid dynasty, from which the Parthian Empire originated.

Antiochus II's son Seleucus II Callinicus came to the throne around 246 BC. Seleucus II was soon dramatically defeated in the Third Syrian War against Ptolemy III of Egypt and then had to fight a civil war against his own brother Antiochus Hierax. Taking advantage of this distraction, Bactria and Parthia seceded from the empire. In Asia Minor too, the Seleucid dynasty seemed to be losing control: the Gauls had fully established themselves in Galatia, semi-independent semi-Hellenized kingdoms had sprung up in Bithynia, Pontus, and Cappadocia, and the city of Pergamum in the west was asserting its independence under the Attalid Dynasty. The Seleucid economy started to show the first signs of weakness, as Galatians gained independence and Pergamum took control of coastal cities in Anatolia. Consequently, they managed to partially block contact with the West.

Revival (223–191 BC)

A revival would begin when Seleucus II's younger son, Antiochus III the Great, took the throne in 223 BC.  Although initially unsuccessful in the Fourth Syrian War against Egypt, which led to a defeat at the Battle of Raphia (217 BC), Antiochus would prove himself to be the greatest of the Seleucid rulers after Seleucus I himself. He spent the next ten years on his anabasis (journey) through the eastern parts of his domain and restoring rebellious vassals like Parthia and Greco-Bactria to at least nominal obedience. He gained many victories such as the Battle of Mount Labus and Battle of the Arius and besieged the Bactrian capital. He even emulated Seleucus with an expedition into India where he met with King Sophagasenus (Sanskrit: Subhagasena) receiving war elephants, perhaps in accordance of the existing treaty and alliance set after the Seleucid-Mauryan War.

Actual translation of Polybius 11.34 (No other source except Polybius makes any reference to Sophagasenus):

When he returned to the west in 205 BC, Antiochus found that with the death of Ptolemy IV, the situation now looked propitious for another western campaign. Antiochus and Philip V of Macedon then made a pact to divide the Ptolemaic possessions outside of Egypt, and in the Fifth Syrian War, the Seleucids ousted Ptolemy V from control of Coele-Syria. The Battle of Panium (200 BC) definitively transferred these holdings from the Ptolemies to the Seleucids.  Antiochus appeared, at the least, to have restored the Seleucid Kingdom to glory.

Expansion into Greece and war with Rome

Following the defeat of his erstwhile ally Philip by Rome in 197 BC, Antiochus saw the opportunity for expansion into Greece itself. Encouraged by the exiled Carthaginian general Hannibal, and making an alliance with the disgruntled Aetolian League, Antiochus launched an invasion across the Hellespont. With his huge army he aimed to establish the Seleucid empire as the foremost power in the Hellenic world, but these plans put the empire on a collision course with the new rising power of the Mediterranean, the Roman Republic. At the battles of Thermopylae (191 BC) and Magnesia (190 BC), Antiochus's forces suffered resounding defeats, and he was compelled to make peace and sign the Treaty of Apamea (188 BC), the main clause of which saw the Seleucids agree to pay a large indemnity, to retreat from Anatolia and to never again attempt to expand Seleucid territory west of the Taurus Mountains. The Kingdom of Pergamum and the Republic of Rhodes, Rome's allies in the war, gained the former Seleucid lands in Anatolia. Antiochus died in 187 BC on another expedition to the east, where he sought to extract money to pay the indemnity.

Roman power, Parthia and Judea

The reign of his son and successor Seleucus IV Philopator (187–175 BC) was largely spent in attempts to pay the large indemnity, and Seleucus was ultimately assassinated by his minister Heliodorus.

Seleucus' younger brother, Antiochus IV Epiphanes, now seized the throne. He attempted to restore Seleucid power and prestige with a successful war against the old enemy, Ptolemaic Egypt, which met with initial success as the Seleucids defeated and drove the Egyptian army back to Alexandria itself. As the king planned on how to conclude the war, he was informed that Roman commissioners, led by the Proconsul Gaius Popillius Laenas, were near and requesting a meeting with the Seleucid king. Antiochus agreed, but when they met and Antiochus held out his hand in friendship, Popilius placed in his hand the tablets on which was written the decree of the senate and told him to read it. The decree demanded that he should abort his attack on Alexandria and immediately stop waging the war on Ptolemy. When the king said that he would call his friends into council and consider what he ought to do, Popilius drew a circle in the sand around the king's feet with the stick he was carrying and said, "Before you step out of that circle give me a reply to lay before the senate." For a few moments he hesitated, astounded at such a peremptory order, and at last replied, "I will do what the senate thinks right." He then chose to withdraw rather than set the empire to war with Rome again.

On his return journey, according to Josephus, he made an expedition to Judea, took Jerusalem by force, slew a great many who had favored Ptolemy, sent his soldiers to plunder them without mercy.  He also spoiled the temple, and interrupted the constant practice of offering a daily sacrifice of expiation, for three years and six months.

The latter part of his reign saw a further disintegration of the Empire despite his best efforts. Weakened economically, militarily and by loss of prestige, the Empire became vulnerable to rebels in the eastern areas of the empire, who began to further undermine the empire while the Parthians moved into the power vacuum to take over the old Persian lands. Antiochus' aggressive Hellenizing (or de-Judaizing) activities provoked a full scale armed rebellion in Judea—the Maccabean Revolt. Efforts to deal with both the Parthians and the Jews as well as retain control of the provinces at the same time proved beyond the weakened empire's power. Antiochus orchestrated a military campaign, capturing Artaxias I, King of Armenia, and reoccupying Armenia. His offensive ventured as far as Persepolis, but he was forced from the city by the populace. On his return home,  Antiochus died in Isfahan in 164 BC.

Civil war and further decay

After the death of Antiochus IV Epiphanes, the Seleucid Empire became increasingly unstable. Frequent civil wars made central authority tenuous at best. Epiphanes' young son, Antiochus V Eupator, was first overthrown by Seleucus IV's son, Demetrius I Soter in 161 BC. Demetrius I attempted to restore Seleucid power in Judea particularly, but was overthrown in 150 BC by Alexander Balas – an impostor who (with Egyptian backing) claimed to be the son of Epiphanes. Alexander Balas reigned until 145 BC when he was overthrown by Demetrius I's son, Demetrius II Nicator. Demetrius II proved unable to control the whole of the kingdom, however. While he ruled Babylonia and eastern Syria from Damascus, the remnants of Balas' supporters – first supporting Balas' son Antiochus VI, then the usurping general Diodotus Tryphon – held out in Antioch.

Meanwhile, the decay of the Empire's territorial possessions continued apace. By 143 BC, the Jews in the form of the Maccabees had fully established their independence. Parthian expansion continued as well. In 139 BC, Demetrius II was defeated in battle by the Parthians and was captured. By this time, the entire Iranian Plateau had been lost to Parthian control.

Demetrius Nicator's brother, Antiochus VII Sidetes, took the throne after his brother's capture. He faced the enormous task of restoring a rapidly crumbling empire, one facing threats on multiple fronts. Hard-won control of Coele-Syria was threatened by the Jewish Maccabee rebels. Once-vassal dynasties in Armenia, Cappadocia, and Pontus were threatening Syria and northern Mesopotamia; the nomadic Parthians, brilliantly led by Mithridates I of Parthia, had overrun upland Media (home of the famed Nisean horse herd); and Roman intervention was an ever-present threat. Sidetes managed to bring the Maccabees to heel and frighten the Anatolian dynasts into a temporary submission; then, in 133, he turned east with the full might of the Royal Army (supported by a body of Jews under the Hasmonean prince, John Hyrcanus) to drive back the Parthians.

Sidetes' campaign initially met with spectacular success, recapturing Mesopotamia, Babylonia, and Media. In the winter of 130/129 BC, his army was scattered in winter quarters throughout Media and Persis when the Parthian king, Phraates II, counter-attacked. Moving to intercept the Parthians with only the troops at his immediate disposal, he was ambushed and killed at the Battle of Ecbatana in 129 BC. Antiochus Sidetes is sometimes called the last great Seleucid king.

After the death of Antiochus VII Sidetes, all of the recovered eastern territories were recaptured by the Parthians. The Maccabees again rebelled, civil war soon tore the empire to pieces, and the Armenians began to encroach on Syria from the north.

Collapse (100–63 BC)

By 100 BC, the once-formidable Seleucid Empire encompassed little more than Antioch and some Syrian cities. Despite the clear collapse of their power, and the decline of their kingdom around them, nobles continued to play kingmakers on a regular basis, with occasional intervention from Ptolemaic Egypt and other outside powers. The Seleucids existed solely because no other nation wished to absorb them – seeing as they constituted a useful buffer between their other neighbours. In the wars in Anatolia between Mithridates VI of Pontus and Sulla of Rome, the Seleucids were largely left alone by both major combatants.

Mithridates' ambitious son-in-law, Tigranes the Great, king of Armenia, however, saw opportunity for expansion in the constant civil strife to the south. In 83 BC, at the invitation of one of the factions in the interminable civil wars, he invaded Syria and soon established himself as ruler of Syria, putting the Seleucid Empire virtually at an end.

Seleucid rule was not entirely over, however. Following the Roman general Lucullus' defeat of both Mithridates and Tigranes in 69 BC, a rump Seleucid kingdom was restored under Antiochus XIII. Even so, civil wars could not be prevented, as another Seleucid, Philip II, contested rule with Antiochus. After the Roman conquest of Pontus, the Romans became increasingly alarmed at the constant source of instability in Syria under the Seleucids. Once Mithridates was defeated by Pompey in 63 BC, Pompey set about the task of remaking the Hellenistic East, by creating new client kingdoms and establishing provinces. While client nations like Armenia and Judea were allowed to continue with some degree of autonomy under local kings, Pompey saw the Seleucids as too troublesome to continue; doing away with both rival Seleucid princes, he made Syria into a Roman province.

Culture

The domain of the Seleucids stretched from the Aegean Sea to what is now Afghanistan and Pakistan, therefore including a diverse array of cultures and ethnic groups. Greeks, Assyrians, Armenians, Georgians, Persians, Medes, Mesopotamians, Jews, and more all lived within its bounds.  The immense size of the empire gave the Seleucid rulers a difficult balancing act to maintain order, resulting in a mixture of concessions to local cultures to maintain their own practices while also firmly controlling and unifying local elites under the Seleucid banner.

The government established Greek cities and settlements throughout the empire via a program of colonization that encouraged immigration from Macedonia and Greece; both city settlements as well as rural ones were created that were inhabited by ethnic Greeks.  These Greeks were given good land and privileges, and in exchange were expected to serve in military service for the state.  Despite being a tiny minority of the overall population, these Greeks were the backbone of the empire: loyal and committed to a cause that gave them vast territory to rule, they overwhelmingly served in the military and government.  Unlike Ptolemaic Egypt, Greeks in the Seleucid Empire seem to rarely have engaged in mixed marriages with non-Greeks; they kept to their own cities.

The various non-Greek peoples of the empire were still influenced by the spread of Greek thought and culture, a phenomenon referred to as Hellenization.  Historically significant towns and cities, such as Antioch, were created or renamed with Greek names, and hundreds of new cities were established for trade purposes and built in Greek style from the start. Local educated elites who needed to work with the government learned the Greek language, wrote in Greek, absorbed Greek philosophical ideas, and took on Greek names; some of these practices then slowly filtered down to the lower classes.  Hellenic ideas began an almost 250-year expansion into the Near East, Middle East, and Central Asian cultures.

Synthesizing Hellenic and indigenous cultural, religious, and philosophical ideas met with varying degrees of success.  The result was times of simultaneous peace and rebellion in various parts of the empire.  In general, the Seleucids allowed local religions to operate undisturbed, such as incorporating Babylonian religious tenets to gain support.  However, a rare exception proved one of the most heavily documented parts of Seleucid history: the Maccabean Revolt in Judea.  While most Seleucid governments had ignored Judaism, under King Antiochus IV the government rather uncharacteristically banned and restricted its practice after a period of favoritism and apparently selling the High Priest position to the highest bidder.  The result was the eventual loss of control of Judea to an independent Hasmonean kingdom, proving the wisdom of the usual policy of not overly interfering with local religious practice.

Military

As with the other major Hellenistic armies, the Seleucid army fought primarily in the Greco-Macedonian style, with its main body being the phalanx. The phalanx was a large, dense formation of men armed with small shields and a long pike called the sarissa. This form of fighting had been developed by the Macedonian army in the reign of Philip II of Macedon and his son Alexander the Great. Alongside the phalanx, the Seleucid armies used a great deal of native and mercenary troops to supplement their Greek forces, which were limited due to the distance from the Seleucid rulers' Macedonian homeland. The size of the Seleucid army usually varied between 70,000 and 200,000 in manpower.

The distance from Greece put a strain on the Seleucid military system, as it was primarily based around the recruitment of Greeks as the key segment of the army. In order to increase the population of Greeks in their kingdom, the Seleucid rulers created military settlements. There were two main periods in the establishment of settlements, firstly under Seleucus I Nicator and Antiochus I Soter and then under Antiochus IV Epiphanes. The military settlers were given land, "varying in size according to rank and arm of service'. They were settled in 'colonies of an urban character, which at some point could acquire the status of a polis". The settler-soldiers were called Katoikoi; they would maintain the land as their own and in return, they would serve in the Seleucid army when called. The majority of settlements were concentrated in Lydia, northern Syria, the upper Euphrates and Media. Antiochus III brought Greeks from Euboea, Crete and Aetolia and settled them in Antioch.

These Greek settlers would be used to form the Seleucid phalanx and cavalry units, with picked men put into the kingdom's guards' regiments. The rest of the Seleucid army would consist of native and mercenary troops, who would serve as light auxiliary troops. While the Seleucids were happy to recruit from less populated and outlying parts of the Empire such as the Arabs and Jews, Iranian peoples in the east, and inhabitants of Asia Minor to the north, they generally eschewed recruiting native Syrians and native Mesopotamians (Babylonians). This was presumably mostly from a desire not to train and arm the people who were an overwhelming majority in the trade and governmental centers of the Empire in Antioch and Babylon, risking revolt. While a revolt in a remote place could be put down by resolute action from the center, an uprising in Syria-Coele would have undermined the kingdom's very existence. 

Following losses of territory in Asia Minor during the Roman-Seleucid War, King Antiochus IV sponsored a new wave of immigration and settlements to replace them and maintain enough Greeks to staff the phalanxes seen at the military parade at Daphne in 166–165 BC.  Antiochus IV built 15 new cities "and their association with the increased phalanx... at Daphne is too obvious to be ignored".

Economy 
As a Hegemonic empire, much of the state's wealth accumulation centered around maintaining its sizable military. While the motive is simple enough, the Seleucid empire boasts of a sophisticated political economy that extracts wealth from local temples, cities (or poleis), and royal estates; much of which was inherited from their Achaemenid predecessors. Recent discussion indicates a market-oriented economy under the Seleucids. However, evidencing limits our understanding of the Seleucid economy to the Hellenistic Near-East; that is, through their holdings in Syria, Asia Minor, and Mesopotamia. Little is known about the economy of the Upper Satrapies.

Monetization

Currency plays an increasingly central role under the Seleucids; however, we should note that monetization was nothing new in their newly acquired lands. Rather, the introduction and widespread implementation of currency is attributed to Darius I's tax reforms centuries prior; hence, the Seleucids see a continuation rather than shift in this practice, i.e. the payment of taxation in silver or, if necessary, in kind. In this regard, the Seleucids are notable for paying their sizeable armies exclusively in silver. Nevertheless, there are two significant developments of currency during the Seleucid period: the adoption of the "Attic Standard" in certain regions, and the popularization of bronze coinage.

The adoption of the Attic standard was not uniform across the realm. The Attic standard was already the common currency of the Mediterranean prior to Alexander's conquest; that is, it was the preferred currency for foreign transactions. As a result, coastal regions under the Seleucids —Syria and Asia Minor—were quick to adopt the new standard. In Mesopotamia however, the millennia-old shekel (weighing 8.33g Silver) prevailed over the Attic standard. According to Historian R.J. van der Spek, this is due to their particular method in recording price, which favored bartering over monetary transactions. The Mesopotamians used the value of one shekel as a fixed reference point, against which the amount of a good is given. Prices themselves are accounted in terms of their weight in silver per ton, i.e. 60g Silver, Barley, June 242 BC. The minute difference in weight between a Shekel and Didrachm (weighing 8.6g Silver) could not be expressed in this barter system. And the use of a Greek tetradrachm would be "a far too heavy denomination…in daily trade."

Bronze coinage, dating from the late fifth and fourth century, and was popularized as a "fiduciary" currency facilitating "small-scale exchanges" in the Hellenistic period. It was principally a legal tender which circulated only around its locales of production;[3]however, the great Seleucid mint at Antioch during Antiochus III's reign (which Numismatist Arthur Houghton dubs "The Syrian and Coele-Syrian Experiment") began minting bronze coins (weighing 1.25–1.5g) to serve a "regional purpose." The reasons behind this remain unclear. However, Spek notes a chronic shortage of silver in the Seleucid empire. In fact, Antiochus I's heavy withdrawal of silver from a satrap is noted by the Babylonian astronomical diary (AD No. –273 B 'Rev. 33'): "purchases in Babylon and other cities were made in Greek bronze coins." This was unprecedented because "in official documents [bronze coins] played no part"; it was a sign of "hardship" for the Seleucids. Nevertheless, the low denomination of bronze coinage meant it was used in tandem with bartering; making it a popular and successful medium of exchange.

Agriculture

Agriculture, like most pre-modern economies, constituted a vast majority of the Seleucid economy. Somewhere between 80 and 90% of the Seleucid population was employed, in some form, within the prevailing agricultural structures inherited from their Neo-Babylonian and Achaemenid predecessors. These included temples, poleis, and royal estates. We should clarify that the term poleis, according to Spek, did not confer any special status to cities in the Seleucid sources; it was simply the term for "city"—Greek or otherwise. Regardless, agricultural produce varied from region to region. But in general, Greek poleis produced: "grain, olives and their oil, wine…figs, cheese from sheep and goats, [and] meat." Whereas Mesopotamian production from temple land consisted of: "barley, dates, mustard (or cascuta/dodder), cress (cardamom), sesame and wool"; which, as the core region of the Seleucid empire, was also the most productive.

Recent evidence indicates that Mesopotamian grain production, under the Seleucids, was subject to market forces of supply and demand. Traditional "primitivist" narratives of the ancient economy argue that it was "marketless"; however, the Babylonian astronomical diaries show a high degree of market integration of barley and date prices—to name a few—in Seleucid Babylonia. Prices exceeding 370g silver per ton in Seleucid Mesopotamia was considered a sign of famine. Therefore, during periods of war, heavy taxation, and crop failure, prices increase drastically. In an extreme example, Spek believes tribal Arab raiding into Babylonia caused barley prices to skyrocket to a whopping 1493g silver per ton from 5–8 May, 124 BC. The average Mesopotamian peasant, if working for a wage at a temple, would receive 1 shekel; it "was a reasonable monthly wage for which one could buy one kor of grain= 180 [liters]." While this appears dire, we should be reminded that Mesopotamia under the Seleucids was largely stable and prices remained low. With encouraged Greek colonization and land reclamation increasing the supply of grain production, however, the question of whether this artificially kept prices stable is uncertain.

The Seleucids also continued the tradition of actively maintaining the Mesopotamian waterways. As the greatest source of state income, the Seleucid kings actively managed the irrigation, reclamation, and population of Mesopotamia. In fact, canals were often dug by royal decrees, to which "some were called the King's Canal for that reason." For example, the construction of the Pallacottas canal was able to control the water level of the Euphrates which, as Arrian notes in his Anabasis 7.21.5, required: "over two months of work by more than 10,000 Assyrians."

Role of the state—political economy

As a hegemonic empire, the state's primary focus was maintaining its sizable army via wealth extraction from three major sources: tribute from autonomous poleis and temples, and proportional land-tax from royal land. The definition of "royal land" remains contested. While all agree poleis do not constitute royal land, some remain uncertain over the status of temple land. Yet, they commanded notable economic power and functioned almost independently from the state. Nevertheless, the Seleucid manner of extraction, in contrast to earlier regimes, is considered more "aggressive" and "predatory".

In theory, the Seleucid state was an absolute monarchy that did not recognize private property in our modern sense. Any land that was not delegated to the poleis or temples was considered private property of the sovereign; thus, considered as Royal Land and liable to direct tax by the state. Here, a "proportional land-tax", that is, a tax based on the size of one's plot, is collected by the local governor (or Satrap) and sent to the capital. However, there is no evidence for the amount that was taxed on any given region.

Tribute was heavily levied on poleis and temples. Although tribute is paid annually, the amount demanded increases significantly during wartime. During a civil war in 149 BC, Demetrius II demanded the province of Judaea to pay 300 talents of silver, which was seen as "severe." But this was far from an isolated case. In fact, the Babylonian Astronomical Diaries in 308/7 BC note a hefty 50% tax on harvest "from the lands of the temple of Shamash (in Sipprar or Larsa)." Nevertheless, annual tribute was "a long-accepted and uncontroversial practice." Also, royal land was regularly donated to the temples and poleis; albeit under the assumption that a greater share of revenue is given to the state in exchange.
The controversial practice of temple "despoliation", however, was a regular occurrence under the Seleucids—in contrast to earlier times. Although the Seleucid kings were aware and appreciated the sacrosanctity of religious treasures, their concentration in these places "proved irresistible" in the face of "short-term fiscal constraints." As an example, Antiochus III's despoliation of the Anahit Temple in Ecbatana, wherein he procured 4000 silver talents, was used to fund his Great Eastern campaign. According to historian Michael J. Taylor:It is difficult to believe that these monarchs who knew enough to bow before Nabu, bake bricks for Esagil, and enforce kosher regulations in Jerusalem, would be blithely aware of the political hazards of removing Temple treasures. It is more likely that they knew the risks but took them anyway.

A rebellion in 169 BC during Antiochus III's campaign in Egypt demonstrates that these "risks" occasionally backfire. The increasingly bold interference is due, in large part, to the appointment of provincial high-priests by the monarch himself. Often they were his court "favorites", whose prerogatives were purely administrative; essentially, they served to collect tribute for the state. Unsurprisingly: "native elites profoundly feared that the arrival of a Seleucid official might quickly cascade into a wholesale removal of Temple treasures."

Academic discussion 
Interpretations on the Seleucid economy since the late 19th century traditionally fell between the "modernist" and "primitivist" camps. On one hand, the modernist view—largely associated with Michael Rostovtzeff and Eduard Meyer—argues that the Hellenistic economies operated along price-setting markets with capitalist enterprises exported over long distances in "completely monetarized markets." On the other hand, the primitivist view—associated with M.I. Finley, Karl Polanyi and Karl Bücher—interprets ancient economies as "autarchic" in nature with little to no interaction among each other. However, recent discussion has since criticized these models for their grounding on "Greco-centric" sources.

Recent discussion has since rejected these traditional dichotomies. According to Spek and Reger, the current view is that the Seleucid economy—and Hellenistic economies more broadly—were partially market-oriented, and partially monetarized. While the market was subject to forces of supply and demand, a majority of produce was still consumed by their producers and was,  hence, "invisible" to the observer.

Family tree of Seleucids

See also

Seleucid army
Seleucid dynasty
Hellenistic period
Greco-Bactrian Kingdom
Hasmonean dynasty
Indo-Greek Kingdom
Parthian Empire
Cilician pirates

References

Bibliography 
 
 
 
 Sherwin-White, Susan, and Kuhrt, Amelie, From Samarkhand to Sardis: A New Approach to the Seleucid Empire (London: Duckworth, 1993). ISBN 978-0-520081833.

Further reading
 1 Maccabees
G. G. Aperghis, The Seleukid Royal Economy. The Finances and Financial Administration of the Seleukid Empire, Cambridge, 2004.
Laurent Capdetrey, Le pouvoir séleucide. Territoire, administration, finances d'un royaume hellénistique (312-129 avant J.C.). (Collection "Histoire").  Rennes:  Presses Universitaires de Rennes, 2007.
D. Engels, Benefactors, Kings, Rulers. Studies on the Seleukid Empire between East and West, Leuven, 2017 (Studia Hellenistica 57).
A. Houghton, C. Lorber, Seleucid Coins. A Comprehensive Catalogue, Part I, Seleucus I through Antiochus III, With Metrological Tables by B. Kritt, I-II, New York – Lancaster – London, 2002.
 R. Oetjen (ed.), New Perspectives in Seleucid History, Archaeology and Numismatics: Studies in Honor of Getzel M. Cohen, Berlin – Boston: De Gruyter, 2020
 J. Taylor, Antiochus the Great (Barnsley: Pen and Sword, 2013).

External links

Livius, The Seleucid Empire  by Jona Lendering
Genealogy of the Seleucids
Seleucid Research Bibliography, compiled and maintained by the Seleucid Study Group 

 
Ancient history of Iran
Former empires in Asia
Former countries in Central Asia
Former countries in South Asia
Former countries in Western Asia
4th-century BC establishments
States and territories established in the 4th century BC
310s BC establishments
312 BC
States and territories disestablished in the 1st century BC
63 BC disestablishments
Classical Anatolia
Empires and kingdoms of Iran
Offshoots of the Macedonian Empire
Former monarchies of Central Asia
Former monarchies of Western Asia
Former monarchies of South Asia